This page lists the winners and nominees for the Soul Train Music Award for Best Jazz Album. The award was first given during the 1989 ceremony, after the categories honoring solo albums and group albums were combined. The category was retired after the 1999 ceremony.

Winners and nominees
Winners are listed first and highlighted in bold.

1980s

1990s

See also
 Soul Train Music Award for Best Jazz Album – Group, Band or Duo
 Soul Train Music Award for Best Jazz Album – Solo

References

Soul Train Music Awards
Jazz awards
Album awards